Fingerprince is the third studio album by American art rock group the Residents, released in 1977. It was allegedly intended to be a three-sided record titled Tourniquet of Roses, but due to financial difficulties in fulfilling such a project, the record was instead cut down to a regular two-sided album.

The album is considered a transitional period for the Residents, between the early avant-garde stylings of Meet the Residents and The Third Reich 'N' Roll and the minimalist song structures of Duck Stab and the Commercial Album.

Music 
Fingerprince's first side consists of short, minimalist songs featuring skeletal drum machines, emphasized horn and percussion sections, murky atmospherics (except for the upbeat "You Yesyesyes") and a bigger focus on vocals and lyrics.

The second side consists of one 17-minute track titled "Six Things to a Cycle", originally written as a ballet. It is an instrumental suite composed of six movements, with a strong focus on percussion and repetition of a single motif. Eventually the improvised percussion is joined by wordless vocals, keyboards, horns and violins.

A third side of music was planned for the album before the decision to release it as a standard single LP. This third side was eventually released in 1979 as an EP titled Babyfingers, which mirrors the standard LP – short songs on one side, a single long composition on the other side.

Release history 
For the CD release of Fingerprince, all of the songs from Babyfingers, which were originally supposed to be part of the record, were included in their original running order.

The 1995 Euro Ralph CD reissue of Fingerprince kept the original track order from the original LP but included the complete Babyfingers as a bonus 3" CD with the album. All subsequent reissues of the album include all three sides, with slight alterations in the track order.

Reception 

In the December 31, 1977 issue of Sounds magazine, Jon Savage notes that this album is more accessible than the band's first two albums, comparing it to Steely Dan and Frank Zappa "put through 10 years and a considerable warp." He also compares the Residents' integrity and outrage to the first punk "explosion."  Andy Gill of New Musical Express compared the second side of the album to Harry Partch.

Track listing

CD releases

2018 pREServed Edition

Personnel

 The Residents – vocals, guitars, horns, synthesizers, keyboards, percussion
 Snakefinger – vocals, guitars
 Don Jackovich – percussion
 Adrian Dekbar – violin
 Tony Logan – percussion
 Pamela Zeibak – vocals

References

The Residents albums
Ralph Records albums
1977 albums